River Trails School District 26 is a school district headquartered in Mount Prospect, Illinois, in the Chicago metropolitan area. The school district serves more than 1,500 students in four schools.

Schools
River Trails School District 26 operates one middle school, two elementary schools and one early learning center.

Board of Education
William Grimpe, President
Janine Freedlund, Vice President
Donna Johnson, Secretary
Louis Camardo
Frank Fiarito
Becky Pfisterer
Robert Rognstad

Administration
Superintendent: Dr. Jodi Megerle
Assistant Superintendent for Business Services: Dr. Lyndl Schuster
Assistant Superintendent for Special Services: Dr. Carie Cohen
Assistant Superintendent for Teaching and Learning: Kristine Seifert
Director of Innovation and Technology: Matt Tombs
Director of Building and Grounds: Dan Whisler

References

External links
 

Mount Prospect, Illinois
School districts in Cook County, Illinois